Mobarezabad (also Romanized as Mobārezābād) is a village in Choghamish Rural District, Choghamish District, Dezful County, Khuzestan Province, Iran. At the 2006 census, its population was 61, in 10 families.

References 

Populated places in Dezful County